

Events
By August, the biographical poem L'histoire de Guillaume le Maréchal, commissioned to commemorate the life of William Marshal, 1st Earl of Pembroke, is completed, probably by a Tourangeau layman called John in the southern Welsh Marches.
Palaizi and Tomier compose the sirventes "De chantar farai" during the siege of Avignon by Louis VIII of France.
The poem "Of Sir Tristrem" was translated into Norse under the title of "Saga af Tristrand og Isaldis".

Deaths
 October 3 - Francis of Assisi, 44, first Italian poet

References

13th-century poetry
Poetry